Zakhary (Kharyton or Kharko) Oleksiyovych Chepiha, sometimes transliterated Chepiga, alternative surname: Kulish (1725 – 14 January 1797) was, after Sydir Bily, the second Kosh ataman of the Black Sea Cossack Host.

Chepiha was born in Chernihiv Oblast. He arrived at the Zaporozhian Sich in 1740 and at its demise in 1775 was a Cossack polkovnyk. He retired with the title of Captain. In 1783 he made an unsuccessful attempt at organizing a cohort of volunteer cossacks from the Zaporozhia.

After meeting up with Catherine II in 1787, he was one of the cossacks to convince the Empress in allowing the formation of the Host of the Loyal Zaporozhians, later known as the Black Sea Cossack Host.

Soon afterwards the Russo-Turkish War (1787–1792) broke out, and the new cossack host received its battle christening on the Southern Bug river during the Battle of Ochakov.

During a campaign in 1788, Chepiha was wounded by a bullet to the shoulder. After Sydor Bily's death, he was proclaimed the Host's ataman. He took part in the storming of Izmail in 1790 and the battle of Babodah in 1791. For his efforts, Chepiha received the rank of the Order of St. George. In 1792 he took part in the resettlement of the Black Sea Cossacks to the Kuban. He died in 1797 and was buried in Yekaterinodar.

References

Further reading 
 H. Kvitka-Osnovianenko - Holovatyi in: Zaporozhtsi. Istoriyi Kozatskoyi kultury Kyiv, 1993. p.`130-140 
 A. Kaschenko - Opovidannia pro Slavne vijsko zaporoz'ke nyzove - Kyiv, 1992. (The story about the Glory of the army of lower Zaporizhzhia)
 Encyclopedia of the Ukrainian Cossacks - Published by the Zaporozhian State University
 Encyclopedia of the Ukrainian Cossacks, Kyiv 2006 p. 629

1725 births
1797 deaths
Atamans
Russian people of the Kościuszko Uprising
People from Chernihiv Oblast